The Department of Management Studies, IIT (ISM) Dhanbad is the business school of Indian Institute of Technology (Indian School of Mines), Dhanbad which was established in 1977. The Department admits students on the basis of Common Admission Test (CAT). Recently it fetched 29th position in NIRF 2020 rankings introduced by the MHRD.

Programmes offered

Undergraduate 
The Department runs minor courses for UG Students of other disciplines in the subjects of:
 Financial management
 Operations management
 Marketing management
 Human Resource management

Postgraduate 
The Department offers the following courses for PG Students:
 Master of Business Administration (MBA) (Duration: 2 years)(Intake-62)
 MBA in Business analytics ( Intake-30)
 Master of Technology in Industrial Engineering and Management (Duration: 2 years)
 Executive MBA (extended program) (Duration: 3 years) 
[Note: Since 2019, new admission for Executive MBA has been put on hold till further notice.]

The Department also offers Doctoral programmes for candidates.

Laboratories 

The Department has four laboratories:

 Human engineering laboratory
 Work study laboratory
 Systems laboratory
Psychology laboratory

Industrial Interaction 
The Department has taken part in consultancy projects of various organisations and has also offered Executive Development Programmes to several business houses and organisations. Some of the Industry partners/clients of the department include: The World Bank, CIMFR, BSNL, NCL, Coal India Limited, etcetera.

Research activities 
The Department has a large number of sponsored research projects funded by several agencies. Some of the organisations entrusting projects to the Department are AICTE, MHRD, Hindustan Zinc Limited, ICSSR, UGC, CMPDIL, World Bank, CIL, etcetera.

References

External links 

Official Website

Business schools in Jharkhand
Education in Dhanbad
1977 establishments in Bihar
Educational institutions established in 1977